2001 Urawa Red Diamonds season

Competitions

Domestic results

J.League 1

Emperor's Cup

J.League Cup

Player statistics

Other pages
 J.League official site

Urawa Red Diamonds
Urawa Red Diamonds seasons